Qullar (also, Gullar) is a village and municipality in the Balakan District of Azerbaijan. It has a population of 5,794. The municipality consists of the villages of Gullar and Ajlygbina.

References 

Populated places in Balakan District